Parrish is an unincorporated community located in the town of Parrish, Langlade County, Wisconsin, United States.

History
A post office called Parrish was established in 1889, and remained in operation until it was discontinued in 1963. Parrish was named for a railroad official.

References

Unincorporated communities in Langlade County, Wisconsin
Unincorporated communities in Wisconsin